Gerard Vernon Wallop, 9th Earl of Portsmouth (16 May 1898 – 28 September 1984), styled Viscount Lymington from 1925 until 1943, was a British landowner, writer on agricultural topics, and politician involved in right-wing groups.

Early life
Gerard was born in Chicago, the eldest son of Oliver Henry Wallop and Marguerite Walker. His father moved to Wyoming, where he was a rancher and  served in the Wyoming State Legislature. After the deaths of his two older brothers without sons, Oliver succeeded as 8th Earl of Portsmouth, and renounced his American citizenship to serve in the House of Lords. Gerard was brought up near Sheridan, Wyoming in the United States, where his parents farmed. He was educated in England, at Farnborough, at Winchester College and at Balliol College, Oxford. He then farmed at Farleigh Wallop in Hampshire. Wallop was commissioned a temporary second lieutenant (probationary) in the Reserve Regiment, 2nd Life Guards on 19 January 1917, was transferred to the Guards Machine Gun Regiment on 10 May 1918, and commissioned a temporary lieutenant on 19 July 1918.

Conservative Party politics
Lord Lymington was Conservative Member of Parliament for the Basingstoke constituency from 1929 to 1934. He stepped down and caused a by-election in March 1934 (Henry Maxence Cavendish Drummond Wolff was elected). At this point he was in the India Defence League, an imperialist group of Conservatives around Winston Churchill, and undertook a research mission in India for them.

He attended the second Convegno Volta in 1932, with Christopher Dawson, Lord Rennell of Rodd, Charles Petrie and Paul Einzig making up the British representatives. It was on the theme L'Europa.

His exit from party politics was apparently caused by a measure of disillusion, and frustrated ambition.

Newton papers
In 1936, he sent for auction at Sotheby's the major collection of unpublished papers of Isaac Newton, known as the Portsmouth Papers. These had been in the family for around two centuries, since an earlier Viscount Lymington had married Newton's great-niece.

The sale was the occasion on which Newton's religious and alchemical interests became generally known. Broken into a large number of separate lots, running into several hundred, they became dispersed. John Maynard Keynes purchased many significant lots. Theological works were bought in large numbers by Abraham Yahuda. Another purchaser was Emmanuel Fabius, a dealer in Paris.

Right-wing groups
Wallop was a member of and important influence on the English Mistery, a society promoted by William Sanderson and founded in 1929 or 1930. This was a conservative group, with views in tune with his own monarchist and ruralist opinions.

A split in the Mistery left Wallop leading a successor, the English Array. It was active from 1936 to the early months of World War II, and advocated "back to the land". Its membership included A. K. Chesterton, J. F. C. Fuller, Rolf Gardiner, Hon. Richard de Grey, Hardwicke Holderness, Anthony Ludovici, John de Rutzen, and Reginald Dorman-Smith. It has been described as "more specifically pro-Nazi" than the Mistery; Famine in England (1938) by Lymington was an agricultural manifesto, but traded on racial overtones of urban immigration. Lymington's use of Parliamentary questions has been blamed for British government reluctance to admit refugees.

He edited New Pioneer magazine from 1938 to 1940, collaborating with John Warburton Beckett and A. K. Chesterton. The gathering European war saw him found the British Council Against European Commitments in 1938, with William Joyce. He joined the British People's Party in 1943. The English Array was not shut down, as other organisations of the right were in the war years, but was under official suspicion and saw little activity.

Organic movement

Wallop was an early advocate of organic farming in Britain. He has been described as a "central figure in the organic movement’s coalescence during the 1930s and ’40s."

He founded the Kinship in Husbandry with Rolf Gardiner, a precursor of the Soil Association. It recruited Edmund Blunden, Arthur Bryant, H. J. Massingham, Walter James, 4th Baron Northbourne, Adrian Bell, and Philip Mairet.

Family and personal life
He was married twice and had five children.

On 31 July 1920, he married Mary Lawrence Post (divorced 1936), daughter of Waldron Kintzing Post Sr., of Bayport, Long Island, and Mary Lawrence née Perkins. They had two children:
 Oliver Kintzing Wallop, Viscount Lymington (14 January 1923 – 5 June 1984; aged 61), married as his second wife, Ruth Violet Sladen, daughter of Brig.-Gen. Gerald Carew Sladen , and Mabel Ursula, of the Orr Ewing baronets, and had:
Quentin Wallop, 10th Earl of Portsmouth
 Lady Anne Camilla Evelyn Wallop  (12 July 1925 – 25 January 2023; aged 97) who married Lord Rupert Nevill, younger son of Guy Larnach-Nevill, 4th Marquess of Abergavenny.

In 1936, he married secondly, Bridget Cory Crohan, only daughter of Capt. Patrick Bermingham Crohan  by (Edith) Barbara Cory (later Bray), of Owlpen Manor, Gloucestershire. They had three children:
 Lady Philippa Dorothy Bluet Wallop (21 August 1937 – 31 August 1984; aged 47) who married Charles Cadogan, Viscount Chelsea and had issue
 Lady Jane Alianora Borlace Wallop (24 February 1939 – 30 November 2021; aged 82)
 Hon. Nicholas Valoynes Bermingham Wallop (born 14 July 1946), married Lavinia Karmel, only daughter of David Karmel 

Gerard Wallop succeeded to the title of Earl of Portsmouth in 1943, on the death of his father Oliver.

After the war he moved to Kenya, where he lived for nearly 30 years. His seat at Farleigh House was let as a preparatory school from 1953.

The Earl's elder son, Oliver, predeceased him; on his death in 1984, the title passed to his grandson Quentin.

Works
Spring Song of Iscariot (Black Sun Press, 1929) poem, as Lord Lymington
Ich Dien - the Tory Path (1931) as Lord Lymington
Famine in England (1938)
Alternative to Death (1943)
A Knot of Roots (1965) autobiography

References

Bibliography

External links

IHS Press page

1898 births
1984 deaths
Alumni of Balliol College, Oxford
British Army personnel of World War I
British emigrants to Kenya
British fascists
British Life Guards officers
Wallop, Gerard
9
Organic farmers
People educated at Winchester College
People from Farleigh Wallop
Politicians from Chicago
People from Sheridan, Wyoming
Wallop, Gerard
Wallop, Gerard
Portsmouth, E9
Gerard